The 2001–02 international cricket season was from September 2001 to April 2002. This season featured 43 Test matches, 88 One-day Internationals, 5 first class matches, 5 List A matches,  2 Women's Test matches and 20 Women's One Day Internationals.

Season overview

September

South Africa in Zimbabwe

October

England in Zimbabwe

2001 Standard Bank Triangular Tournament

India in South Africa

New Zealand in Australia

2001 Khaleej Times Trophy

November

West Indies in Sri Lanka

Zimbabwe in Bangladesh

England in India

December

South Africa in Australia

Bangladesh in New Zealand

2001 LG Abans Triangular Series

Zimbabwe in Sri Lanka

January

England Women in India

Pakistan in Bangladesh

2001–02 VB Series

Kenya in Sri Lanka

Pakistan vs West Indies in U.A.E

February

Zimbabwe in India

England in New Zealand

Australia in South Africa

Australia Women in New Zealand

March

India Women in South Africa

April

2002 Sharjah Cup

References 

 
2001 in cricket
2002 in cricket